Saros cycle series 151 for solar eclipses occurs at the Moon's ascending node, repeating every 18 years, 11 days, containing 72 events, with 68 before 3000 AD. All eclipses in this series occurs at the Moon's ascending node.

This solar saros is linked to Lunar Saros 144.

Umbral eclipses
Umbral eclipses (annular, total and hybrid) can be further classified as either: 1) Central (two limits), 2) Central (one limit) or 3) Non-Central (one limit). The statistical distribution of these classes in Saros series 151 appears in the following table.

Events

References 
 http://eclipse.gsfc.nasa.gov/SEsaros/SEsaros151.html

External links
Saros cycle 151 - Information and visualization

Solar saros series